Biryusinsk is a town in Tayshetsky District of Irkutsk Oblast, Russia, located on the right bank of the Biryusa River (Angara's basin),  northwest of Irkutsk, the administrative center of the oblast. Population: 

It was previously known as Suyetikha (until 1967).

History
It was founded in 1897 as Suyetikha, named so after the Suyetikha River.. In 1934, it was granted work settlement status. It was granted town status in 1967 and renamed Biryusinsk after the Biryusa River.

Administrative and municipal status
Within the framework of administrative divisions, Biryusinsk is subordinated to Tayshetsky District. As a municipal division, the town of Biryusinsk is incorporated within Tayshetsky Municipal District as Biryusinskoye Urban Settlement.

Economy
Biryusinsk's industrial enterprises include a timber factory and a hydrolysis plant.

References

Notes

Sources

Registry of the Administrative-Territorial Formations of Irkutsk Oblast

External links
Official website of Biryusinsk 
Biryusinsk Business Directory 

Cities and towns in Irkutsk Oblast
Cities and towns built in the Soviet Union